The Specials is a 2019 French drama film directed by Olivier Nakache & Éric Toledano. It was screened out of competition at the 2019 Cannes Film Festival. The film is inspired by the true story of Stéphane Benhamou and Daoud Tatou.

Plot
Bruno (Vincent Cassel) runs an organization helping people with autism by finding job placements and activities for them outside of the confines of the institutionalized hospital setting, along with Malik (Reda Kateb), who certifies teenagers from Paris's rough neighborhoods to care for autistic patients. Bruno continually hires more staff despite his organization's financial problems. His organization is also under investigation by the social affairs inspector for operating without a license. Bruno gets Joseph, his oldest patient, a job at a washing machine manufacturer, but Joseph struggles with the temptation to pull fire alarms on metro trains during his commute.

One of Malik's students, Dylan, works with a patient named Valentin. Dylan struggles with appreciating the value of the program and is disrespectful toward Malik, who is training them to receive certificates to work with autistic children.

Cast
 Vincent Cassel as Bruno
 Reda Kateb as Malik
 Helene Vincent
 Bryan Mialoundama
 Lyna Khoudri as Ludivine
 Alban Ivanov
 Benjamin Lesieur
 Marco Locatelli
 Catherine Mouchet
 Frederic Pierrot
 Suliane Brahim

Reception
The film received highly positive reviews. On review aggregator website Rotten Tomatoes, the film has an approval rating of 82%.

References

External links
 

2019 drama films
2019 films
2010s French films
2010s French-language films
Films about autism
Films directed by Olivier Nakache and Éric Toledano

French drama films